The 2011 Le Gruyère European Curling Championships were held in Moscow, Russia from December 2 to 10. The Group C competitions were held from September 30 to October 8 in Tårnby, Denmark.

Scotland's Eve Muirhead, last year's runner-up, won the gold medal in the women's tournament after defeating last year's champions Sweden, skipped by Margaretha Sigfridsson, in the final in eight ends. Russia's Anna Sidorova won the bronze medal over Denmark's Lene Nielsen. In the men's tournament, Thomas Ulsrud and team from Norway successfully defended their title by defeating Sweden's Niklas Edin. Last year's runners-up Denmark, skipped by Rasmus Stjerne, won the bronze medal after defeating Jiří Snítil of the Czech Republic, who led his team to the Czech Republic's best finish at the European Championships so far.

A total of seven men's and seven women's teams qualified for the 2012 World Championships. On the men's side, Sweden, Norway, Denmark, the Czech Republic, Germany, Scotland, and France (who defeated Russia in the World Challenge Games), qualified for the 2012 Capital One World Men's Curling Championship and will join hosts Switzerland in competition. On the women's side, Scotland, Russia, Denmark, Germany, Italy, Switzerland, and the Czech Republic (who defeated Hungary in the World Challenge Games), qualified for the 2012 Ford World Women's Curling Championship and will join defending champions Sweden in competition.

Men

Group A
The Group A competitions were contested in Moscow. Ten teams, including the teams advancing from last year's Group B competitions (Italy and Latvia), competed in a round robin. The top four teams moved on to the page playoffs. In the page playoffs, Sweden edged defending champions Norway, while the Czech Republic got a close win over Denmark, last year's runners-up. Norway defeated Czech Republic in the semifinal, sending the Czechs to the bronze medal game. Norway moved to the gold medal game, where they defeated Sweden with skip Thomas Ulsrud's draw against two Swedish stones in the final end, finishing with a final score of 7–6. Denmark also won their rematch with the Czech Republic, defeating them 9–6 in 9 ends.

France, the eighth placed team, played Group B winners Russia in the World Challenge Games, and defeated Russia in a best-of-three series to win the final berth at the 2012 Capital One World Men's Curling Championship.

Round-robin standings
Final round-robin standings

Playoffs

Bronze-medal game
Friday, December 9, 20:00

Gold-medal game
Saturday, December 10, 15:00

Group B
The Group B competitions were contested in Moscow. Sixteen teams, including the teams advancing from the Group C competitions (Poland and Lithuania), were divided into two groups and competed in a round robin within their own groups. The top two teams from each group moved on to the page playoffs. Hungary, the leader of the Red Group, defeated Ireland, the leader of the Blue Group, sending Ireland to the semifinal. Russia, the second-ranked team in the Red Group, defeated England, the runner-up of the Blue Group, and advanced to the semifinal. Russia moved on to the gold medal game, where they defeated Hungary to win the Group B competitions. Ireland was defeated by England in the bronze medal game.

Russia and Hungary advance to the 2012 Men's Group A competitions, and Russia played France in the World Challenge Games, where France defeated Russia in a best-of-three series to win the final berth at the 2012 Capital One World Men's Curling Championship. Belarus and Croatia were relegated to the 2012 Men's Group C competitions.

Round-robin standings
Final round-robin standings

Playoffs

Bronze-medal game
Saturday, December 10, 9:30

Gold-medal game
Friday, December 9, 13:00

Group C
The Group C competitions were contested in Tårnby. The nine participating teams competed in one group of nine and played in a round robin. The top two teams, Poland and Lithuania, advanced to Group B. Poland finished with a 7–1 win–loss record, while Lithuania and Turkey, both finishing with 6–2 win–loss records, played for the second qualifying spot in the semifinal, which went to Lithuania. Poland defeated Lithuania narrowly in the Group C Final, winning after a steal in the ninth end, 7–6.

Round-robin standings
Final round-robin standings

Playoffs

Gold-medal game
Thursday, October 6, 19:30

Women

Group A
The Group A competitions were contested in Moscow. Ten teams, including the teams advancing from last year's Group B competitions (the Czech Republic and Italy), competed in a round robin. The top four teams moved on to the page playoffs. In the page playoffs, defending champions Sweden soundly defeated Denmark, while Scotland, last year's runners-up, won in an extra end over Russia. Scotland then defeated Denmark in the semifinal, which sent Denmark to the bronze medal game. Scotland then stormed past Sweden, winning the gold medal game in eight ends with an 8–2 score. Scotland won their second championship, their first since the inaugural championships in 1975. Russia secured a bronze medal win over Denmark with a five-point 10th end, making the final score 13–7.

The Czech Republic, the eighth placed team, played Group B winners Hungary in the World Challenge Games, and defeated Hungary in a best-of-three series to win the final berth at the 2012 Ford World Women's Curling Championship.

Round-robin standings
Final round-robin standings

Playoffs

Bronze-medal game
Friday, December 9, 20:00

Gold-medal game
Saturday, December 10, 10:00

Group B
The Group B competitions were contested in Moscow. Ten teams, including the teams advancing from the Group C competitions (Poland and Slovakia), competed in a round robin. The top four teams moved on to the page playoffs. In the page playoffs, Hungary defeated Finland, and Poland defeated Slovakia in a rematch of the Group C final. Poland came close to earning a spot in the Group A competitions, but Finland defeated Poland in the semifinal with a winning point in the 10th end, sending Poland back to play against Slovakia. Hungary secured the top spot in the Group B competitions with a 4–1 win over Finland in nine ends. Slovakia stole their way to a win over Poland in their third matchup, winning in ten ends.

Hungary and Finland advance to the 2012 Women's Group A competitions, and Hungary played the Czech Republic in the World Challenge Games, where France defeated Russia in a best-of-three series to win the final berth at the 2012 Ford World Women's Curling Championship. Ireland and Wales were relegated to the 2012 Men's Group C competitions.

Round-robin standings
Final round-robin standings

Playoffs

Bronze-medal game
Saturday, December 10, 9:30

Gold-medal game
Friday, December 9, 13:00

Group C
The Group C competitions were contested in Tårnby. The ten participating teams competed in two groups of five and played in a round robin within their own groups. The top two teams from each group then played in a page playoff, and the two finalists, Poland and Slovakia will advance to Group B. Poland defeated France in the 1 vs. 2 playoff game, while Slovakia defeated both Turkey and France en route to reaching the final. Poland defeated Slovakia in the Group C Final in seven ends, 8–4.

Round-robin standings
Final round-robin standings

Playoffs

Gold-medal game
Thursday, October 6, 19:30

References

External links
Event Home Page
ECC Group C tournament Home Page
ECF ECC page

European Curling Championships
European Championships
European Curling Championships, 2011
European Curling Championships, 2011
European Curling Championships
European Curling Championships
2011 in European sport
2011 in Moscow
International curling competitions hosted by Denmark
International curling competitions hosted by Russia
December 2011 sports events in Europe
December 2011 sports events in Russia